Orange Walk Football Club is a Belizean football team, currently playing in the Premier League of Belize.

The team is based in Orange Walk Town, Orange Walk District. Their home stadium is People's Stadium, and was founded on 21 June 2016.

References

Football clubs in Belize
association football clubs established in 2016
2016 establishments in Belize